In enzymology, an RNA ligase (ATP) is an enzyme that catalyzes the chemical reaction

ATP + (ribonucleotide)n + (ribonucleotide)m  AMP + diphosphate + (ribonucleotide)n+m

The 3 substrates of this enzyme are ATP, (ribonucleotide)n, and (ribonucleotide)m, whereas its 3 products are AMP, diphosphate, and (ribonucleotide)n+m.

This enzyme belongs to the family of ligases, specifically those forming phosphoric-ester bonds.  The systematic name of this enzyme class is poly(ribonucleotide):poly(ribonucleotide) ligase (AMP-forming). Other names in common use include polyribonucleotide synthase (ATP), RNA ligase, polyribonucleotide ligase, and ribonucleic ligase.

Structural studies

References

 

EC 6.5.1
Enzymes of known structure